The Sandman is a 1991 stop-motion animation film, animated and directed by Paul Berry (1961–2001) and nominated for an Oscar for Best Animated Short Film in 1993. The storyline is inspired by the E.T.A. Hoffmann's version of the European legend of The Sandman.

Plot
Late on a moonlit evening, a young boy is sent up to bed by his mother. He walks through the darkened hallway of his house and ascends the long, narrow flights of stairs alone, becoming increasingly paranoid that something is following him, until he reaches the safety of his bedroom. As he's drifting off to sleep, he sees a face appear in the crescent Moon outside his window.

At the bottom of the stairs, a monstrous, bird-like man appears, looking like the face the boy saw. It begins to clamber upstairs, slamming doors and creaking floorboards all the way to let the boy know of its impending presence. Frightened, the boy accidentally knocks over his oil lamp—alerting the monster to exactly what room he's in. The boy hides under the covers, as a figure opens the door and approaches his bed. It's revealed to be his mother, who retrieves the broken lamp and tucks him in for the night. As he falls asleep, feeling safe once more, the monster appears in his room and begins to make noise, trying to rouse him. When the boy finally opens his eyes, the monster blows sand in them and takes something from him, before departing through the bedroom window.

The monster returns to its nest on the Moon, where its hungry children are waiting. The monster gets out the boy's eyes, which it plucked out, and feeds its young with them.

In the post-credits scene, the boy, now blind, walks helplessly among a crowd of children who've been victimized.

Style and influence
The art direction of The Sandman was highly influenced by German Expressionism.

See also
 In 2000, the Brothers Quay made a film, also called The Sandman, which follows a similar plot.

References

External links

The Sandman on Vimeo

1991 animated films
1991 films
1990s animated short films
British animated short films
Sandman in film
Cosgrove Hall Films films
Films based on The Sandman (short story)
Films scored by Colin Towns
Animated horror films
1990s British films